Atlantic Institution is a Canadian federal corrections facility located in the community of Renous, New Brunswick.

It is in proximity to Moncton, with about a two-hour driving distance.

The Atlantic Institution handles male offenders only.

History
It was opened in 1987 on the north bank of the Southwest Miramichi River; the property was formerly used as an ammunition depot, by the Canadian Forces.

Renous was selected as the site for the new maximum security prison for Atlantic Canada during the early 1980s after the aging Dorchester Penitentiary was evaluated as being unsuitable for the changing focus of correctional services for repeat and violent offenders.

Following the opening of Atlantic Institution, the Dorchester Penitentiary was downgraded to handle medium security prisoners in conjunction with the Springhill Institution.

Notable residents 
 David Mylvaganam, conspirator in the murder of Bich-Ha Pan and attempted murder of Hann Pan masterminded by Jennifer Pan
 Serial killer Allan Legere was housed here until his escape (during a hospital visit in Moncton for an ear infection) on May 3, 1989 and went on a year long terror spree in Miramichi, New Brunswick. Once caught, he was then moved to Canada's only super maximum-security prison Centre régional de réception in Quebec.
Justin Bourque, infamous for the Moncton shooting.
George Pitt, convicted of rape and murder of 6-year-old Samantha Dawn Toole in Saint John, New Brunswick in 1993.
Christopher Garnier, murder of an off-duty Truro Policewoman he met in a bar in downtown Halifax.
Sofyan Boalag, Dangerous offender convicted of 3 rapes in St Johns. One victim was a 6-year-old girl.

References

External links
 profile from Corrections Canada

Correctional Service of Canada institutions
Buildings and structures in Northumberland County, New Brunswick
Prisons in New Brunswick
1987 establishments in New Brunswick